In 2001, the Australia national cricket team toured England and Ireland to play county matches and the 2001 Ashes series. Australia won the Test series 4–1 and retained the Ashes, that had been in their possession since the 1989 Ashes series.

The Ashes series was played from 5 July to 27 August. The series was retained by the Australian team 4–1, continuing the streak of victories since 1989. The players of the series were Glenn McGrath from Australia and Mark Butcher from England. The England captain Michael Atherton finished his international career after the fifth and final test of the series.

The Australian team played tour matches against English teams in:

Worcestershire County Cricket Club
Middlesex County Cricket Club
Northamptonshire County Cricket Club
Marylebone Cricket Club
Essex County Cricket Club
Somerset County Cricket Club
Hampshire County Cricket Club
Sussex County Cricket Club

Tour matches refer to County cricket matches and international one-day tests.

They also played a one-day series against Ireland. These games were played between the five matches played in the Ashes series.

Australia also played in the NatWest Series with England and Pakistan.

Australia team

Coach 
The coach of the team was John Buchanan, who coached the team between 1999 and 2007. Buchanan had previously led the Queensland cricket team to their first Sheffield Shield title. In his tenure as coach, Australia won three Cricket World Cups.

Captain 
The Australian team was captained by Steve Waugh who had captained the side since 1999 to what cricket editor S Rajesh described as their "most successful peak in decades".

Vice-captain was wicketkeeper Adam Gilchrist, who was described as "instrumental" to the teams success. The Australian batting side was headed by Damien Martyn, with the "Dream Team", bowling side including Brett Lee, Shane Warne, Glenn McGrath and Jason Gillespie.

Selection before the Tour 
Much of the team prior to the series had been playing in English County Cricket competitions. Through this, they made up 6 of the top 12 run scorers in two county divisions.

During the selection of the team, batsman Justin Langer was originally not chosen by Steve Waugh. However, Justin Langer replaced Michael Slater for the last match of the Ashes series.

The selection committee for the 2001 team was Trevor Hohns, Andrew Hilditch, David Boon and Allan Border. All four were the selection committee from 2000 to 2005.

Changes to the team 
Due to the success of the team during the series the team remained unchanged between the tests. Between the 3rd and 4th Tests, Steve Waugh was injured after tearing his calf midway through the 3rd test but returned after a 19-day therapy plan.

The team had been successful previously holding a record of 16 consecutive wins between 1999 and 2001. In the series Gilchrist, Martyn, and both Waugh brothers made nearly 1500 runs together. McGrath and Warne were described as "unstoppable", combining 63 wickets at 18, becoming "one of the most dominant one-two acts" in an Ashes series.

The Australian team had 17 players. In a poll by the Australian Cricket Network among cricket fans, 7 players were named as the "Best Australian Ashes players". Hayden, Langer, Ponting, Waugh, Gilchrist, Warne and McGrath all featured.

Australia squad

England Team

Injury

General 
According to a study on the 2001 international cricket season, injuries ranged from 19.0 injuries per 10,000 players in domestic matches to 38.5 injuries per 10,000 players in One Day Internationals. This is, however, an average of Australian teams. Within the 2001 international matches there were 22.2 injuries per 10 000 player hours. Studies done on injuries in cricket rely on the definition of injuries being made clear, either incorporating any reasons for a player to miss a match or criteria for an injury including the roles a player may have in a series.

Team injuries 
Originally in the team party, Nathan Bracken was chosen to play in the one-day tests but injured a shoulder. Ashley Noffke was brought in to replace him but was replaced himself after damaging ankle ligaments at a practise. Brett Lee then was brough in to play in the one-day series, as well as the Tests.

Steve Waugh injured himself between the Second and Third tests in the Ashes series, in a promotional game of squash between Waugh and No 1 Squash player Sarah Fitz-Gerald for the 2002 Commonwealth Games in Manchester. He began to play in the Third Test but ripped his calf in the game having a 5-centimetre tear. Waugh made a 19-day recovery plan and played in the Third Test, taking 6 for 33, but did not bat.

Ireland tour 
Captain Steve Waugh did not travel for the Ireland leg of the tour due to injury, which also ruled him out of the fourth Test. Adam Gilchrist was also not in Ireland, so Ponting was named captain for the series. In the team, Hayden and Mark Waugh had played in 1993 in Dublin, while Waugh, Langer, Ponting and McGrath had all played in Eglinton in 1997.

The Irish team had no players from the 1993 competition but Derek Heasley, Andy Patterson and Kyle McCallan had both played in 1997.

England tour 
Australia played six first-class One Day International games.

In the first-class games Damien Martyn had the highest batting average with an average of 104.66 runs per game, with 9 games played. He also had the most runs between the English and Australian teams with 942 runs, followed by Ponting, Gilchrist and Mark Waugh with 844, 663 and 644 runs respectively.

Shane Warne took the most wickets in the first-class games with 42 wickets. He also took the most catches in the first-class series with 13 overall, followed by Mark Waugh and Ponting with 12 and 11.

Adam Gilchrist took the most dismissals with 31, beating Seccombe with 10.

First-class

Worcestershire vs Australians

M.C.C vs Australia

Essex vs Australia

Somerset vs Australia

Hampshire vs Australia

Sussex vs Australia

List A

Middlesex vs Australians

Northamptonshire vs Australians

Other One Day: Ireland vs Australians

The Ashes Series

1st Test

England was all out for less than 300 runs in the first innings, despite a 103-run partnership between Alec Stewart and Andy Caddick for the 10th wicket. England collapsed in the second innings from 142/2 to be all out for 164.

2nd Test

3rd Test

Shane Warne was named man of the match for 8 wickets. Adam Gilchrist took 10 fours and made 54 with Gillespie taking 27. In the first innings they were all out for 122. Shane Warne took 6 for 33 in the first innings with Jason Gillespie taking 3 low order wickets making England out for 162. Steve Waugh had to retire from the game due to injury.

4th Test

Australia elected to bat first and held a lead of 138 after the first innings. In the second innings, Australia declared on 176/4, setting England a target of 315 for victory. They reached this with six wickets in hand, thanks to an unbeaten 173 by Mark Butcher. Butcher was named Player of the Match, for what Gilchrist described as "one of the great Ashes innings".

5th Test

Australia elected to bat first. In the first innings, Australia was 641/4 and chose not to bat again. Over England's two innings, Glenn McGrath took 7 wickets overall. In England's first innings, they scored 432 runs and in the second took 184.

Shane Warne was described as Player of the Match, with Mark Butcher and Glenn McGrath named as Players of the Series.

Players of the Series

Australian – Glenn McGrath 
During the 2001 Ashes series, McGrath passed Dennis Lillie's record of 355 dismissals, becoming the highest wicket taker among Australian fast bowlers. He still holds that record, having extended it to 563 Test wickets. Internationally, he is second only to England's James Anderson with 614.

McGrath played all five matches in the Ashes series. He took the most maiden overs with 56, 14 ahead of Jason Gillespie on 42. He played 194.2 overs, conceding 542 runs. McGrath took the most wickets through the series with 32 with best figures of 7/76. The 2001 Ashes was described as a display of his consistent style.

English – Mark Butcher 
Butcher had not played for England since their tour to South Africa in 1999–2000, missing five straight tours between January 2000 and July 2001. However, a resurgence in form led to a call-up for the Ashes series.

He played in all five Tests, but after scoring just 14 runs across the two innings in the 3rd Test, he was due to be dropped for the 4th; however, the team's co-captain for the 2nd and 3rd tests, Michael Atherton, intervened and Butcher kept his place in the team. He went on to score 173 not out in the second innings in a performance described as "amazing", as England went on to win the match by 6 wickets. It was termed by Adam Gilchrist, the Australian wicket keeper, as "one of the great Ashes innings".

References

External sources
 Tour results at Cricinfo.com
 CricketArchive – tour itineraries

Annual reviews
 Playfair Cricket Annual 2002
 Wisden Cricketers' Almanack 2003

References

2001
2001 in English cricket
2001
International cricket competitions in 2001
2001 in Australian cricket